Marbella Suns is a defunct American football team that was based in Marbella, Andalusia (Spain).

History
The team was established in 2006 as Manilva Suns, when they started playing in Manilva, moving the franchise later on to Marbella. Finnish player Juri Jurvanen was behind the foundation of the team, acting as president and head coach at the same time. Former Colorado player Zac Colvin helped out from the field as a quarterback to lead the team into major Spanish competition.

In 2009, the team ceased activity.

References 

Defunct American football teams in Spain
American football teams established in 2006
American football teams disestablished in 2009
2006 establishments in Spain
2009 disestablishments in Spain